Hani Al-Owaidh (born July 1, 1979) is a Saudi football player who plays as goalkeeper .

References

1979 births
Living people
Saudi Arabian footballers
Al-Qadsiah FC players
Al-Faisaly FC players
Khaleej FC players
Najran SC players
Al-Adalah FC players
Saudi First Division League players
Saudi Professional League players
Saudi Second Division players
Saudi Fourth Division players
Association football goalkeepers
Saudi Arabian Shia Muslims